Falcon Beach is a Canadian television show, filmed at Winnipeg Beach and Winnipeg, Manitoba, Canada, and produced for the Canadian and American markets. It originally aired in 2005 as a movie on Global in Canada. It was produced as a TV series for Global and ABC Family in 2006. It is also currently in first run showings internationally in several languages.

It was unique among Canadian TV series in that the producers filmed two versions of each episode. The first was for Canada and uses Canadian geographic references and terminology. The second version was done for the United States and uses American geographic references and terminology. The film is set in the fictional resort town of Falcon Beach, Manitoba (New England for U.S. viewers), the program is a teen drama similar in style to The O.C.

Falcon Beach (Season 1) aired first run episodes in the U.S. on ABC Family throughout the summer of 2006. The second season on ABC Family aired in the summer of 2007. After a stellar ratings debut, numbers for the program slipped after Global moved the program around its schedule multiple times. Despite the declining ratings, Global renewed the series for an additional 13 episodes. Season 2 aired on Fridays at 8pm. The season premiere aired January 5, 2007 on Global.

Cast and characters

Main
 Steve Byers as Jason Tanner: He is a poor teenager who lives in Falcon Beach with his mother. They own a marina that's barely breaking even. His childhood's friends are Tanya Shedden and Danny Ellis. In the first season of the show, he was a professional wakeboarder and he still loves to do it for fun, even though he doesn't compete anymore. He has dated Tanya Shedden, Paige Bradshaw, and Courtney True. In the last episode he got back together with Paige, his one true love. 
 Jennifer Kydd as Paige Bradshaw: She is a pretty, smart and rich girl, the daughter of Trevor and Ginny Bradshaw. She is attending Harvard Business School. She sometimes acts as if she doesn't care about anyone, but she still has feelings for Jason, whom she had been dating. In the last episode the two lovebirds take a trip to Texas. 
 Devon Weigel as Tanya Shedden: She is a broke fashion model who moved back to her hometown of Falcon Beach because she was sick of modeling. She was also a drug addict (cocaine, etc.) in the first season and her relationship with town bad-boy Lane Bradshaw didn't help. Tanya got caught with marijuana and went to court and was found guilty. She got back together with Lane Bradshaw (whom she broke up with in the first season) and this relationship has been the only steady relationship with few problems during this season. 
 Ephraim Ellis as Danny Ellis: The nice guy. His family runs a local arcade and dance hall. He has many brothers. His parents are dirt poor because they have a lot of kids. He had a major crush on Erin which led to them dating. After they found out that she was pregnant, they moved in with her parents, and when the baby was stillborn, the stress was too much for Erin and they broke up. Now, in the second season his bad side is emerging, in a desperate effort to save the town of Falcon Beach where he grew up, he has done something illegal. Will he get caught? Since Erin left the beach he also seems to be getting closer to a 17-year-old girl who knows his secret, which is that he was planting false artifacts on the digging site for the Bradshaw's resort to stop construction.
 Melissa Elias as Erin Haddad: A lifeguard in Falcon Beach. She has also feelings for Danny, and they dated until their baby was stillborn. She is having a very hard time and is not on the show right now because she left the beach to move in with her parents. She and Danny were like the perfect couple for a while, especially on season 1. She is considered the nice girl.
 Morgan Kelly as Lane Bradshaw: Lane is a troubled young rich boy who is always up to something. He is known as the bad boy. He works for his father, Trevor Bradshaw. He has been dating Tanya Shedden, a former model. He also accidentally kills Mook, the head of the local biker gang and drug dealer. He is son of Trevor and Ginny Bradshaw, and the brother of Paige Bradshaw. In the pilot movie played by Eric Johnson.

Recurring
 Allison Hossack as Ginny Bradshaw: The mother of Paige and Lane, wife of Trevor Bradshaw. She is a neglected housewife and plans to divorce Trevor. She was dating a man from the country club, even though she is still married to Trevor.
 Ted Whittall as Trevor Bradshaw: A shrewd, previously rich, once powerful business tycoon who started with nothing. He was the President and CEO of the Bradshaw Group until he was unanimously removed by the board of directors because he had made high-risk investments without proper authorization. When he was ousted as CEO he lost everything and he has been trying to rebuild his toppled empire but is consequently on the verge of financial ruin. He married Ginny Bradshaw and is father of Lane and Paige. Now, he is trying to build a resort in Falcon Beach, much to the dismay of the townspeople. His children have recently realized that their father has committed accounting fraud and embezzlement and that the whole resort is actually an illegal setup. Paige then blackmails Trevor into destroying his purchase of the marina because if he doesn't he will face prison time. 
 Peter Mooney as Dr. Adrian Keeper: At one point Paige's boyfriend and the new doctor of Falcon Beach. He is single, but seems to have a bit of a crush on Tanya Shedden, who is dating Lane Bradshaw.
 Lynda Boyd as Darlene Shedden: The local hairdresser who is the meddling mother of Tanya Shedden. She is always trying to make Tanya do things that Tanya does not want to do, including stopping seeing Lane Bradshaw, moving back home, and beginning her modeling career again. She had an affair with Trevor Bradshaw in the first season.
 Jill Teed as Peggy Tanner: Jason's mother and former wife of Bobby Tanner. She is very stressed out, especially in the second season, because she owns half of the marina along with her son Jason, and it is not doing too well. In the pilot movie played by Barbara Tyson.
 Stephen Eric McIntyre as Mook: He was the head of the local biker gang and the local drug dealer. Lane Bradshaw accidentally killed him.
 Jeananne Goossen as Courtney True: A rich girl spending the summer away from her parents, she befriends Paige and attracts Jason's attention in the second season. She is a daredevil, living life on the fast lane, but underneath her witty remarks and cool exterior is a lonely and vulnerable person. (season 2)
 Stephen Lobo as Nathan (season 2)

Episodes

Pilot movie

Season 1

Season 2

Cancellation
Global TV announced on April 20, 2007 that it was cancelling the series after ABC Family announced they would not be renewing the series for summer of 2008. Fans organized an effort to save the show during mid-2007 that did not succeed. The final episode aired on March 30, 2007; it was broadcast on July 3, 2007 in the United States.

The cancellation of the series was a result of ABC Family's decision to decline bringing it back for a third season. Without the financial support from the U.S. cable channel, continued production of the series was not possible. Executive producer Kim Todd remarked that Global offered to pick the show up for a third season but at a substantially lower cost than the first two seasons.

Falcon Beachs audience was made up of predominantly 12- to 17-year-old girls, among whom the show was popular. However, the series failed to attract many outside that age group and ABC Family wanted a broader demographic – i.e. 18 to 49 viewers.

Music
The music on Falcon Beach is composed by Ari Wise and the music supervisor Sarah Webster. In the movie pilot in 2005, the music was supplied by many Canadian indie acts as well major label Canadian artists.
Pilate
Brundlefly
Doctor
Paper Moon
Matt Mays & El Torpedo
Sam Roberts
Holly McNarland
Sloan
BOY

The title theme song "Beautiful Blue" is sung by Winnipeg-born Holly McNarland.

DVD release
BCI Eclipse released Falcon Beach - The Complete First Season on DVD in the US on September 4, 2007. As of 2009, this release has been discontinued and is out of print as BCI Eclipse ceased operations.

References

External links

 The Official Falcon Beach Website

ABC Family original programming
Global Television Network original programming
2000s Canadian teen drama television series
2006 Canadian television series debuts
2007 Canadian television series endings
Fictional populated places in Canada
Canadian television soap operas
Television shows set in Manitoba
Television shows filmed in Winnipeg
Television series by Corus Entertainment